Robert Forgie was an Anglican priest  in Ireland during the 17th century.

Forgie was Precentor of  Killala Cathedral from 1626 to 1636; and Dean of Killala from then  until his murder on 23 February 1642.

Notes

Alumni of Trinity College Dublin
17th-century Irish Anglican priests
18th-century Irish Anglican priests
Deans of Killala
1701 deaths